
Gmina Sulejów is an urban-rural gmina (administrative district) in Piotrków County, Łódź Voivodeship, in central Poland.

The gmina contains part of the protected area called Sulejów Landscape Park.

Villages
Apart from the town of Sulejów, Gmina Sulejów contains the villages and settlements of Adelinów, Barkowice, Barkowice Mokre, Biała, Bilska Wola, Bilska Wola-Kolonia, Dorotów, Kałek, Karolinów, Klementynów, Kłudzice, Koło, Korytnica, Krzewiny, Kurnędz, Łazy-Dąbrowa, Łęczno, Mikołajów, Nowa Wieś, Piotrów, Podkałek, Podlubień, Poniatów, Przygłów, Salkowszczyzna, Uszczyn, Winduga, Witów, Witów-Kolonia, Włodzimierzów, Wójtostwo, Zalesice and Zalesice-Kolonia.

Neighbouring gminas
Gmina Sulejów is bordered by the city of Piotrków Trybunalski and by the gminas of Aleksandrów, Mniszków, Ręczno, Rozprza and Wolbórz.

References
Polish official population figures 2006

Sulejow
Piotrków County